Jackson Township is one of the seventeen townships of Franklin County, Ohio, United States.  The 2010 census found 40,608 people in the township, 4,073 of whom lived in the unincorporated portions of the township.

Geography
Located in the southern part of the county, it borders the following townships and city
Parts of Franklin Township – north
Columbus – northeast
Hamilton Township – southeast
Scioto Township, Pickaway County – south
Pleasant Township – west
Prairie Township – northwest

Much of Jackson Township has been annexed into one of three municipalities:
The city of Columbus, the county seat of Franklin County, in the northeast
The city of Grove City, in the center
The village of Urbancrest, in the northwest

Name and history
It is one of thirty-seven Jackson Townships statewide.

Government
The township is governed by a three-member board of trustees, who are elected in November of odd-numbered years to a four-year term beginning on the following January 1. Two are elected in the year after the presidential election and one is elected in the year before it. There is also an elected township fiscal officer, who serves a four-year term beginning on April 1 of the year after the election, which is held in November of the year before the presidential election. Vacancies in the fiscal officership or on the board of trustees are filled by the remaining trustees.

Gallery

References

External links
Township website
County website

Townships in Franklin County, Ohio
Townships in Ohio